Serhiy Burimenko (2 September 1970 – 18 October 2021) was a Ukrainian professional footballer who played as a midfielder player and later worked as a youth coach.

Career
Born in Mykolaiv, Burimenko was a product of the local Sudnobudivnyk Mykolaiv youth sportive school system. His first trainer was Oleksandr Chunikhin. On 10 October 1988, he made a professional debut for his club in the match against FC Desna Chernihiv. 

His football career also included other Ukrainian clubs from different leagues (including Vyshcha Liha). He also spent three years as Estonian legionnaire. In 1995, as a member of the Ukraine national student football team, he participated in the Universiade in Japan. Then in Fukuoka, Ukrainian students under the coach Volodymyr Lozynskyi took fourth place.

After retirement from playing career, he worked as children's football trainer in MFC Mykolaiv and was a director of its youth sportive school since 2013.

References

External links
 Profile at Official UAF website (in Ukrainian)
 Profile at footballfacts.ru (in Russian)

1970 births
2021 deaths
Sportspeople from Mykolaiv
Ukrainian footballers
Soviet footballers
Association football midfielders
Ukrainian Premier League players
Ukrainian First League players
Meistriliiga players
MFC Mykolaiv players
FC Artania Ochakiv players
FC Naftokhimik Kremenchuk players
FC Kremin Kremenchuk players
FC Hirnyk-Sport Horishni Plavni players
FC Oleksandriya players
FC Torpedo Zaporizhzhia players
FC Lootus Kohtla-Järve players
FC Kiviõli Irbis players
JK Sillamäe Kalev players
Ukraine student international footballers
Ukrainian expatriate footballers
Ukrainian expatriate sportspeople in Estonia
Expatriate footballers in Estonia
Ukrainian football managers